Lipographis truncatella is a species of snout moth in the genus Lipographis. It was described by William S. Wright in 1916 and is known from the US states of California and Nevada.

References

Moths described in 1916
Phycitinae